Balsamocitrus camerunensis is a species of plant in the family Rutaceae. It is found in Cameroon and Central African Republic.

References

Sources

camerunensis
Data deficient plants
Taxonomy articles created by Polbot
Flora of Cameroon
Plants described in 1963